Carolyn Charise Jenkins (born January 29, 1969 in Fresno, California), is the assistant commissioner for operations of the West Coast Conference. Previously, Jenkins served as a women's basketball coach in the WNBA, serving as an assistant coach and head coach of the Minnesota Lynx, and as Director of Player Personnel for the WNBA.

Jenkins earned her Bachelor of Arts degree in economics from UC Berkeley (Cal) in 1990. While at Cal, she played 104 career games in four seasons with the Golden Bears from 1986-1990.

After assistant coaching stints at Stanford and Michigan State, Jenkins became the head coach for the women's basketball team at Sacramento State University for three seasons.

Jenkins became the Minnesota Lynx fourth head coach in 2006 after Suzie McConnell-Serio resigned on July 23. She led  the Lynx to a 2-9 record to close out the 2006 WNBA Season.

In December 2006, longtime NBA assistant Don Zierden was named the Lynx head coach, and Jenkins was retained in her current assistant coaching position. On November 1, 2007 Jenkins was named director of player personnel of the WNBA.

External links
WNBA Coach Profile
Sacramento State coaching profile
Jenkins named WNBA Director of Player Personnel

Living people
American women's basketball coaches
Basketball coaches from California
Minnesota Lynx coaches
Minnesota Lynx head coaches
Sacramento State Hornets women's basketball coaches
Stanford Cardinal women's basketball coaches
Michigan State Spartans women's basketball coaches
1969 births